Osunlade (born March 13, 1969) is an American-born musician and music producer.

Biography
Osunlade was born and raised in St. Louis, Missouri. He composed music for Sesame Street during the late 1980s and early 1990s. Afterward, he moved to Los Angeles, California, where he worked with artists such as Patti LaBelle and Freddie Jackson. After a stint there, he moved to New York, where he founded Yoruba Records because of The continued need to create the music i wanted. To date he has worked with such artists as Roy Ayers, Nkemdi, Salif Keita, Poranguí, and Cesária Évora. In 2006, he released an album titled Aquarian Moon, in 2007, he released an album titled Elements Beyond on the revived Strictly Rhythm Records, and, in 2009, he released the album Passage. He is a priest of the Yoruba religion of Ifá. Because of his beliefs, Osunlade's music has a deep spiritual root in Yoruba traditions that are also reflected in the name of his record label, album covers, and also the titles of some of the tracks he has remixed such as "Obatala y Oduduwa" and "Yemeya."

Discography

Singles
1999 "Native Tongue"
2000 "Beats de los Muertos Vol. 1"
2000 "Power to Conquer/Aldeia de Ogum" (as Latina Café)
2001 "Cantos a Ochun et Oya"
2001 "Diamant"
2001 "Rader Du/Blackman" (with Wunmi)
2001 "The Deep"
2001 "Versatile Family Sampler"
2002 "Obatala Y Oduduwa"
2002 "Native Tongue Revisited" (with Jaffa)
2002 "Beloved"
2002 "Pride" (with Nadirah Shakoor)
2002 "New Day" (as Atelewo)
2003 "Chimes of Freedom" (as Atelewo)
2004 "The Year of the Monkey"
2004 "Pride (Remixes)" (with Nadirah Shakoor)
2004 "Same Thing" (with Maiya James)
2005 "The Fifth Dimension"
2005 "New Day/Macaco" (as Atelewo)
2006 "Flow/Sokinsikartep"
2006 "I Don't Know"
2006 "Everything in Its Right Place" (with Erro)
2007 "April"
2008 "Momma's Groove"
2008 "My Reflection" (with Divine Essence)
2012 "Envision" (released on Defected Records)

Appears on
2000 Ebbo - "The Way"
2001 Stephanie Cooke - "Here with My Best Friend"
2001 Masters at Work feat. Lynae - "Life Is but a Dream"
2003 Lonesome Echo Production - "Soul Galactic"
2003 Siji - "Feelslike"
2004 Sin Palabras - "Yemaya"
2004 Siji - "Sanctuary"
2005 KB - "El Musica"
2006 Isoul8 feat. Rasiyah - "Speak Your Word"
2007 Afefe Iku - "BodyDrummin"

Production for other artists
1991 Gerardo - "Rico Suave", "Fandango" (programming, composer, additional production) 
1993 Me 2 U - "Alone Wit U", "Want U Back"
1993 YT Style - "You'll Never Find Another"
1994 BlackGirl - "90's Girl" (original version), "Nubian Prince"
1994 Freddie Jackson - "Was It Something"
1994 Eric Gable - "Process of Elimination"
1996 Eric Benét - "Femininity"
1997 Martha Wash - "Come"
1999 Marie St. James - "Closer I Get"
1999 Eric Benét - "Poetry Girl"
2000 Musiq Soulchild - "Mary Go Round"
2001 Eric Roberson - "Change for Me"
2002 DJ Jazzy Jeff feat. Erro - "Rock Wit U"
2003 Vivian Green - "Emotional Rollercoaster"
2003 Larry Gold - "Just a Dream"
2004 Wei Chi - "Dream"
2005 Nadirah Shakoor - "Just a Breath Away"
2005 Frank-I - "Let the Record Play"
2006 Nadirah Shakoor - "Love Song"
2006 Malena Pérez - "Praise the Day"
2006 Bah Samba - "Tired Little One"
2007 The Piscean Group - The Piscean Group
2007 Mellow Madness - "Now Your Calling"

Albums
2000 Yoruba Records: El Primer Año
2001 Paradigm
2006 Aquarian Moon
2007 Elements Beyond
2010 Rebirth
2011 Pyrography
2013 A Man With No Past Originating the Future
2014 Peacock
2020 Basic Sketches For Beginners

Mixed compilations
2002 Offering
2005 Re-Offering
2006 Soul Heaven (with DJ Spen)
2008 Passage
2009 Mix the Vibe: King Street Goes Yoruba
2012 Defected Presents Osunlade in the House
2014 Atonement

References

External links
 – official site

Osunlade lecture at Red Bull Music Academy
Osunlade interview with Paula Harris, from Groove Parlor TV

1969 births
Living people
African-American musicians
African-American record producers
Record producers from New York (state)
American house musicians
Musicians from New York City
Music of St. Louis
Sesame Street crew
American people of Yoruba descent
Yoruba musicians
Babalawos
Deep house musicians